Glanges is a commune in the Haute-Vienne department in the Nouvelle-Aquitaine region in west-central France.

Geography
The river Briance flows west through the northern part of the commune and forms part of its northeastern and northwestern borders.

See also
Communes of the Haute-Vienne department

References

Communes of Haute-Vienne